Armando Muñoz, also known by his codename Darwin, is a mutant superhero appearing in American comic books published by Marvel Comics.

Edi Gathegi played the character in the film X-Men: First Class.

Publication history
Darwin first appeared in X-Men: Deadly Genesis #2 (February 2006), created by writer Ed Brubaker and artist Pete Woods .

Fictional character biography

Early life and Krakoa
After birth, Darwin's powers of self-protection and continuous circumstantial evolution made his mother hate him. The Afro-Hispanic boy was found by scientists who experimented on him, bringing him to the attention of the public. He was found by Moira MacTaggert and recruited as one of her "fosters". He was in the first team, along with Kid Vulcan, Petra, and Sway to attempt to rescue the X-Men from Krakoa.

While Petra and Sway were killed by Krakoa, Darwin and Vulcan were swallowed in the earth by a combination of Sway and Petra's dying powers. Darwin absorbed the remains of the two girls and then converted himself into energy to fuse together with Vulcan. This gave Vulcan the powers of Darwin, Petra, and Sway. Rachel Summers managed to expel Darwin's presence from Vulcan, who then took off for space. While dealing with the shocking revelations of the truth about Krakoa and Vulcan, Beast found out that Darwin was in fact still alive. He was brought back to the Institute, where Beast determined Darwin was now a being of pure energy. While not conscious, he was shown to still have brain activity and was still alive, located at the X-Mansion. Once separated from Vulcan, Darwin's abilities caused him to develop a physical form once more.

The Rise and Fall of The Shi'ar Empire
When the Uncanny X-Men team (including Warpath, Havok, Polaris, Marvel Girl, Nightcrawler, and Professor Xavier) left to go hunt down Vulcan and stop him from destroying the Shi'ar, it was revealed that the Professor brought Darwin with them with hope that his friendship with Vulcan would help. When Shi'ar agents abducted Professor X, Darwin followed, and secretly jumped onto their spacecraft as it fled.

After successfully rescuing Xavier from his captors, Darwin was well on his way to freedom when D'Ken was revealed to be alive and well. Recaptured by the Imperium guards, Darwin failed in his attempt of rescuing his mentor and reluctantly accepted Vulcan's offer of becoming best man at his and Deathbird's wedding.

Though obviously against the union, Darwin attended the wedding—albeit in shackles—and was caught in the crossfire when the X-Men and Starjammers attacked. Fearing his great day to be completely ruined by the interference, Vulcan trapped Xavier within the M'Kraan Crystal. Naturally fearing for his mentor's safety, Darwin followed Xavier into the depths of the crystal, and rescued him. He was taken to the X-Men's space ship with Professor X and Lilandra Neramani sent the ship on its way back to Earth.

World War Hulk
During the World War Hulk storyline, Darwin was one of the X-Men who heeded the call for help when Hulk came to the X-Mansion. While fighting the Hulk, he evolved in order to gain the ability to absorb gamma radiation. Darwin attempted to absorb gamma radiation from the Hulk only to find that the Hulk's gamma radiation supply was far more than he could drain. His body then determined the best way to confront the Hulk was to not confront the Hulk at all and Darwin gained teleportation powers and promptly teleported himself out of the Hulk's path of destruction: a distance of roughly three states away.

Messiah Complex
Darwin reappeared in Messiah Complex and fought alongside the X-Men against the Marauders, Purifiers, Predator X and Cable.

Secret Invasion
Sometime after Messiah Complex, Darwin goes in search of Professor Xavier because he wants to help him. He encounters Longshot, who tries to lead him to the Professor by using his powers. Longshot, however is unsure if his powers have been working correctly and tests them out on a group of people which turn on Darwin and attack. After a brief fight, Darwin manages to get away and the crowd turns on Longshot. Afterward, Longshot meets back up with Darwin and they are attacked by Jazinda and She-Hulk who are trailing after Longshot, who is really a Skrull named Nogor. Darwin also develops a crush on Monet.

Meanwhile, Darwin's father hires X-Factor Investigations to help him find Darwin, supposedly because he feels bad for walking out on him and his mother when he was younger.

Joining X-Factor
After Darwin is reunited with his father, he is betrayed by him and sold out to operatives of an organization known as the Karma Project, who are experimenting on living human beings, only for their attempts to duplicate Darwin's hyper-evolution to fail when the duplicate Darwins' DNA proves incapable of handling his powers.

He is eventually recruited into the team by Siryn after she tells him that with X-Factor, he won't have to deal with the massive threats the X-Men routinely deal with. After Monet is possessed by the villainous Cortex and attacks Lenore, a young woman in the team's care, Darwin bravely fights her off. In the midst of the massive battle, Darwin is accidentally crushed by a Sentinel that had been blasted out of the sky by Siryn. Emerging unharmed from the debris, Darwin cynically mocks her earlier speech about not having to worry about this sort of thing with X-Factor.

Several months later, the team relocates to New York City in order to take advantage of high paying metahuman cases. Darwin is present when the team is hired by Valeria Richards and Franklin Richards, and claims to be intimidated by Valeria's intellect. Darwin seems to still harbor feelings for Monet, becoming angry when Multiple Man tells the team that they may not be able to help her find her kidnapped father.

During a battle with Hela, Darwin adapts to her touch by becoming a death god himself, but has trouble coping with the after-effect of the god-like abilities that were granted to him. He decides to leave the team to adjust and find himself.

On his return to X-Factor in the story arc "Breaking Points", Darwin has been plagued with voices in his head after touching Hela and assuming the form of Hela. These voices reveal to him the possible apocalypse that will be incurred by Rahne's wolf son Tier. He takes it upon himself to kill the wolf, but is met with resistance from Tier and his guardian Werewolf by Night. Despite several attempts to subdue Tier, he is met by Rictor who tries to stop Darwin from killing the child by throwing Darwin off the top of the cliff using his newly regained earthquake-inducing powers. Darwin doesn't die, the result of his evolutionary powers kicking in, but continues the hunt following Rahne's son from another dimension.

Dawn of X
Darwin is seen living a new life in Krakoa after Professor X, Moira McTaggert, and Magneto band together to create a mutant nation.

Darwin, along with Wolverine (Laura Kinney) and Synch, were tasked by the X-Men to infiltrate a Children of the Vault base inside a Master Mold as only they have the powers to adapt to the changes needed to infiltrate the base security. Darwin was selected because his powers has the capability to evaluate the atemporal environment and the Children themselves. The X-Men created a diversion to ensure that the three would be able to enter undetected, to which they succeeded. However, unbeknownst to those who were left outside the Vault, the three were immediately classified as unidentified subjects.

Due to the time flowing differently inside the Vault, they have been gone from the physical world for three months and five days but they have been inside for five hundred and thirty-seven years.

During their first day, while engaging the Children of the Vault in battle, Wolverine and Synch killed most of their foes while Darwin's head got caught in a water bubble from Sangre. After seeing her teammates killed, Aguja angrily killed herself by projecting a force field that destroyed everything around her in an attempt to kill her foes.

However, due to their unique powers Darwin and his teammates recovered. The team then spent 100 years inside the Vault gathering intelligence on the Children. Darwin's adaptation powers slowed or prevented him from aging and learned that City could resurrect any Children that were killed through cloning in order to continuously evolve them. The City eventually became interested in Darwin's power and captured him so it could learn how to create a new generation of Children. Wolverine was also captured. After Synch launched a rescued attempt, he was able to free Wolverine but Darwin was killed during the process by the City so it could use his powers to create a new generation of Children. Synch and Wolverine were later killed by the Children, but Synch was able to make telepathic contact with X and ensure everything they learned about the Vault was passed onto his resurrected form. Wolverine was eventually resurrected too but Darwin was lost into the Vault. Forge later initiated a rescue mission to retrieve Darwin from the Vault. During the rescue mission, Forge and a cloned copy of Caliban do their best to recover their long-missing ally, but their efforts have only caused more chaos, including the discovery that Wolverine had actually survived the mission. While confronted by the Serafina (one of the natives from within the Vault), Forge is wounded and eventually struck by a series of black tendrils from within the Vault lab. This quickly knocks Forge out and allows him to communicate in his dreams with Darwin, whom also survived the Vault. Darwin explains that he spent relative centuries tortured by the Children of the Vault, describing their experiments as "living autopsies". Darwin honestly didn't know how he'd break loose of their containment. But the next time they scanned his mind and memories, Darwin was able to adapt by sneaking his consciousness into their computer systems that power the Vault, becoming a new form of living code. This transformation allowed Darwin to become capable of surviving outside his physical form within a technological space. As Darwin explains all this to Forge, he reveals that he doesn't need to be returned to his physical body, and would rather explore and learn more about the Vault. Darwin tells Forge they'll meet again, and ventures back into the data landscape while Forge rescues Wolverine from the Vault.

Powers and abilities
Darwin has the power of "reactive evolution"; i.e., his body automatically adapts to any situation or environment he is placed in, allowing him to survive possibly anything; the exact nature and limits of his powers have not been revealed.

Examples of his powers include: gaining night-vision after a few seconds in the dark; functional gills after being submerged in water; fire-proof skin after being exposed to flame; increasing his own intelligence; converting his body into pure energy; no longer requiring oxygen after being sucked into space; morphing into a sponge when shot at with a weapon designed to destroy the subject's nervous system; and acquiring comprehension of the Shi'ar language merely by looking at written samples. His power may concern itself with more efficient methods of survival than Darwin himself might choose; for example, instead of continually increasing Darwin's powers when taking punishment from the Hulk, his body simply teleported him away from the fight.

His power can also work when dealing with non-immediately-life-threatening situations, such as rendering it impossible for Darwin to get drunk by allowing his body to process alcohol faster than humans would normally.

Reception
 In 2014, Entertainment Weekly ranked Darwin 71st in their "Let's rank every X-Man ever" list.

In other media
 Darwin makes a cameo appearance in the Wolverine and the X-Men episode "Future X" as a member of Professor X's future X-Men.
 Darwin appears in X-Men: First Class, portrayed by Edi Gathegi. This version is an Afro-Hispanic mutant who initially works as a taxi cab driver before he, among others, is recruited by Charles Xavier and Erik Lehnsherr to help them combat the Hellfire Club. Amdist a fight with the group however, Sebastian Shaw uses energy he absorbed from Alex Summers to kill Darwin. The latter scene has attracted derision from fans, critics and Gathegi, all of whom feel that Darwin's powers should have made him immune and that the scene served as an example of the "black guy dies first" trope.

References

External links
 World of Black Heroes: Darwin Biography
 Darwin at Marvel.com

Characters created by Ed Brubaker
Marvel Comics mutants
Marvel Comics male superheroes
Marvel Comics superheroes
Comics characters introduced in 2006
Superhero film characters
African-American superheroes
Fictional Afro–Latin American people
X-Factor (comics)
X-Men members